Brent Piltz (born 13 November 1978) is a former Australian rules footballer who played with Sydney in the Australian Football League (AFL) in 2001.

References

External links

Living people
1978 births
Australian rules footballers from New South Wales
Sydney Swans players
North Albury Football Club players